Kaka Is 2021 Philippine erotic comedy film written by Conn Escobar and G.B. Sampedro directed by G.B. Samepdro. It stars Sunshine Guimary, Jerald Napoles and Ion Perez. Vincent Del Rosario III, Valerie S. Del Rosario, Veronique Del Rosario-Corpus are the producers of the film.

Cast
 Ion Perez as Levi Sales
 Rosanna Roces as Kams/Kamila Bataan
 Gina Pareño as LolitaKirara/"Lola Kiri/Kiri" Bataan
 Jackie Gonzaga as Bo
 Maui Taylor as Babet
 Andrea del Rosario as Felicia
 Giselle Sanchez as Sue Petra Sales
 Sheree as Joy
 Debbie Garcia as Sicee
 Juliana Parizcova Segovia as Pre
 Pio Balbuena as Bitoy
 Billy Villeta as Boss Alex
 Josef Elizalde as Rick
 Lander Vera-Perez as Danilo Sales
 Janine Teñoso as herself
 Ronnie Liang as himself
 Marion Aunor as herself
 Yuki Sakamoto as Manuel
 Minnie Nato as Amanda
 Ai-Ai Delas Alas as Caller
 Gio Sampedro as Caller
 Marlon Joy Pablo as Caller
 Lotlot Bustamante as Elevator Girl
 Alexine Sy as Party Host

Release
The film was released in the Philippines via streaming in Vivamax on May 28, 2021.

Reception
JE CC from LionheaTV rate the film 2 out of 5 and wrote:

References

External links
 
 

2021 comedy films
Filipino-language films
Viva Films films
Films impacted by the COVID-19 pandemic
Philippine sex comedy films